Piloctenus is a genus of wandering spiders first described by A. Henrard & Rudy Jocqué in 2017.

Species
 it contains four species:
Piloctenus gryseelsi Henrard & Jocqué, 2017 — Guinea
Piloctenus haematostoma Jocqué & Henrard, 2017 — Guinea
Piloctenus mirificus (Arts, 1912) — Togo, Ivory Coast, Guinea
Piloctenus pilosus (Thorell, 1899) — West, Central Africa

References

External links

Araneomorphae genera
Ctenidae